Count Nils Magnus Brahe (1790–1844) was a Swedish statesman and soldier, known as the influential favorite of king Charles XIV John of Sweden.  

Nils Magnus Brahe was the son of Swedish Count Magnus Fredrik Brahe (1756–1826) in his first marriage with Baroness Ulrika Katarina Koskull (1759–1805), and thus a member of the Brahe comital family.   He was also a descendant of Swedish statesman Per Brahe.  

After studying in the University of Uppsala, he began his professional military career. He fought in the War against Napoleon (1813–1814) under Jean Bernadotte who later ascended to the throne as Charles XIV John of Sweden (Swedish: Karl XIV Johan).  He was in high favour with the French born king who had a poor command of the Swedish language. He became Marshal of the Realm, and especially from 1828 onwards, exercised an influence in public affairs.  As a politician, he reportedly remained close to his stepmother, Countess Aurora Wilhelmina Koskull, who was active within Stockholm aristocratic circles and also related to the king's mistress Mariana Koskull.  In 1837, he was elected a member of the Royal Swedish Academy of Sciences.

References

Note

External links

Magnus
Swedish generals
Swedish counts
Members of the Royal Swedish Academy of Sciences
1790 births
1844 deaths
19th-century Swedish military personnel
Marshals of the Realm
Swedish military personnel of the Napoleonic Wars
Swedish royal favourites
Swedish courtiers
19th-century Swedish politicians
Knights of the Order of Charles XIII